Had Boumoussa is a town and rural commune in Fquih Ben Salah Province, Béni Mellal-Khénifra, Morocco. At the time of the 2004 census, the commune had a total population of 41,731 people living in 5959 households.

References

Populated places in Fquih Ben Salah Province
Rural communes of Béni Mellal-Khénifra